Jack Clinton Maddox (December 10, 1919 – July 9, 2006) was an American professional basketball player.

Early life
Maddox received an athletic scholarship to play for the SMU Mustangs but was declared academically ineligible in February 1939. He transferred to the West Texas A&M Buffaloes where he played for three years before joining the Marines. While in the Marines, he played basketball for the Pearl Harbor team.

Professional career
Maddox played in the National Basketball League for the Oshkosh All-Stars and Hammond Calumet Buccaneers between 1946 and 1949, then for the Indianapolis Jets in the Basketball Association of America in 1949 for one game.

Later life
After his professional career, Maddox returned to Texas. He worked as a cowboy and a rancher, and was a calf roper in rodeos while also coaching basketball at Blossom High School.

BAA career statistics

Regular season

References

External links
 
Statistics at statscrew.com

1919 births
2006 deaths
All-American college men's basketball players
American men's basketball players
Basketball players from Texas
Hammond Calumet Buccaneers players
Indianapolis Jets players
Oshkosh All-Stars players
Professional Basketball League of America players
Small forwards
West Texas A&M Buffaloes basketball players